Julian, is a live album by baritone saxophonist Pepper Adams which was recorded in Munich in 1975 and originally released on the Enja label.

Reception

The Allmusic review by Scott Yanow states "Recorded five days before Julian "Cannonball" Adderley's death, the title cut of this album was retitled and dedicated to the late altoist. The powerful baritonist Pepper Adams is well showcased ... in typically excellent form, playing intense solos that push but stay within the boundaries of hard bop". In JazzTimes, Miles Jordan wrote "The caliber of musicianship and the intricately worked-out tunes raise this performance far above a routine club gig". In Jazz Review, Lee Prosser stated "Julian is an example of mainstream jazz at its timeless best, helmed by a neglected master of one of The Big Horns".

Track listing 
All compositions by Pepper Adams except where noted.

 "Jirge" – 9:00
 "Julian" (George Mraz, Pepper Adams) – 7:13
 "Spacemaker" (Walter Norris) – 6:01
 "Ad Astra" – 7:41
 "Three and One" (Thad Jones) – 10:21
 "'Tis" (Jones) – 3:02
 "Time on My Hands" (Vincent Youmans, Harold Adamson, Mack Gordon) – 10:24 Bonus track on CD reissue
 "Lady Luck" (Jones) – 7:11 Bonus track on CD reissue

Personnel
Pepper Adams – baritone saxophone
Walter Norris – piano
George Mraz – bass
Makaya Ntshoko – drums

References

Pepper Adams live albums
1976 live albums
Enja Records live albums